1995–96 Hong Kong FA Cup was the 22nd staging of the Hong Kong FA Cup. It was competed by all of the 10 teams from Hong Kong First Division League. The competition kicked off on 17 March 1996 and finished on 21 April with the final.

South China captured the cup for the sixth time after beating Golden by 4-1 in the final.

Fixtures and results

Bracket

Final

References

Hong Kong FA Cup
Hong Kong Fa Cup
Fa Cup